The Continental Mark V is a personal luxury coupe that was marketed by the Lincoln division of Ford Motor Company from the 1977 to 1979 model years in North America. The fourth generation of the Mark series, the model line brought an extensive modernization to the exterior and interior of the Mark IV. The Mark V introduced a sharp-edged exterior design theme, adopted by Lincoln vehicles into the end of the 1980s.

While only sold for three years, the Mark V is the best-selling generation of the Mark series, with 228,262 examples produced.

All Continental Mark Vs were assembled alongside the Lincoln Continental at the now-closed Wixom Assembly Plant in Wixom, Michigan. For 1980, the Mark V was replaced by the downsized Continental Mark VI; though remaining a full-size vehicle, the Mark VI saw significant reductions in exterior dimensions.

Design overview

For 1977, to reduce internal competition between the two model lines, Ford split the Ford Thunderbird from the Mark series (counterparts since the 1969 Mark III), repackaging it as the counterpart of the Mercury Cougar XR7. Replacing the slow-selling Ford Elite, the new Thunderbird gave Ford a stronger offering against the Chrysler Cordoba, Dodge Charger and the General Motors quartet of the Buick Regal, Chevrolet Monte Carlo, Oldsmobile Cutlass Supreme, and Pontiac Grand Prix.

Chassis 
The Continental Mark V shares its chassis architecture with its predecessor, the Continental Mark IV (developed as a counterpart of the 1972–1976 Ford Thunderbird). During the development of the Mark V, Ford was unable to justify the expense of designing an all-new platform for the vehicle. However, following the successful launch of the Mark IV, a significant design departure would also be considered risky. Although sharing many underpinnings with the Mark IV, in the interest of fuel economy, many updates were performed by Ford engineers. Four-hundred pounds of curb weight was cut bringing the Mark V down to 4600 pounds from the Mark IVs 5000 pounds.

In the interest of fuel economy, the 1977 Continental Mark V was equipped with the smallest-displacement engine fitted in a Lincoln or Continental since 1957. Shared with the Ford Thunderbird/Mercury Cougar and Ford LTD/Mercury Marquis, the standard engine for the Mark V was a 400 cubic-inch V8. Outside of California, the 460 V8 remained available as an option. In 1979, the dual-exhaust version of the 400 was discontinued; the 460 was discontinued in the Mark V (and in all Lincolns) by 1980.

Paired with both engines, the Ford C6 three-speed automatic was the sole transmission offering.

Body 

Marketed as the flagship vehicle of the Lincoln-Mercury Division, the Continental Mark V showcased a new design theme for the Lincoln brand, with styling features from the Mark V appearing on various Lincoln vehicles throughout the 1980s.

The exterior design of the Mark V began life in the late 1960s, as an alternative design proposal for what would become the Continental Mark IV. During the development of the Mark V, chassis designers intended for the vehicle to use specially-designed (wider) Michelin tires, leading to widely flared wheel openings in the design.  Alongside the Lincoln Continental, the Mark V was styled with sharp-edged fender lines. In contrast to Lincoln design precedents, the Mark V shifted towards horizontal edges, with a nearly flat roofline. To increase visibility, the rear window and quarter windows were enlarged.

In Mark-series tradition, the Mark V retained the Continental "spare tire" decklid, oval opera windows, hidden headlights, and a radiator-style grille; the front fenders were given functional louvers behind the front wheels as standard equipment. In a style similar to the Mark III, the Mark V was designed with vertical dual tail lights. During its development, stylists initially designed tail lights that curved into top of the rear fender blades; the design was modified after controversial reviews from focus groups.

While technically considered a $187 option, all Mark Vs were fitted with a vinyl roof unless specifically ordered without one. For 1979, the vinyl roof could no longer be deleted.

Year-by-year changes

1977
Previously standard issue on Marks III and IV, Ford's 7.5-liter (460 cid) V8 (now the industry's largest remaining) was optional for 1977, as a smaller 6.6 L (400 cid) V8 became standard. The 7.5 L V8 was not available at all on Mark V in the state of California, as the powerplant was unable to meet that state's tougher EPA certification standards. Lincoln felt so bad about this, that for 1977 only, California-bound Mark Vs were offered with the newly optional turbine-style aluminum wheels as standard equipment, to compensate for the missing engine option.

Also, 1977 was the first year since 1960 that a Mark-series model came with an all-metal, body-color painted (non-vinyl covered) roof as standard equipment. The full-vinyl roof – previously standard on Mark IV - was now optional, as was the rear-quarter Landau roof. The Givenchy Designer Series had exclusive use of a new, forward-placed, front-vinyl roof in all three years of the Mark V's production.

Mark IV's successful Designer Series Editions continued with revised color combinations on the new Mark V, as well as revised Luxury Group Option color trim packages. First available in mid-1975, as the "Versailles Option", a renamed-for-1977 "Majestic Velour Luxury Group" carried over to the Mark V - for 1977 only (minus the upper door trim panel wood-tone moldings - which were on Mark IV with the Versailles option). The returning Gold/Cream and new Cordovan Luxury Groups came with an available unique (small block pattern) "Romano Velour" on the seat pillow inserts and matching upper door panel inserts - this too was also a relatively rare 1977-only one hit wonder.

Another limited-run, mid-year introduction was the Spring Luxury Group option, which came in the customer's combination of selecting Dove Grey (1N) or Dark Blue Metallic (3G) for the exterior paint color, a choice of Dove Grey or Dark Blue for the vinyl roof color, bodyside molding color and paint stripe color - with those same Dove Grey and Dark Blue colors in a standard two-tone leather interior.

Luxury wheel covers, dating back to the 1972 Mark IV, were carryover as standard on all Mark Vs, except for Designer Series models. The Mark IV-era forged aluminum wheels carried on as optional, as would new-for-1977 Turbine Style aluminum wheels (machined wheel lip and spoke edges with argent grey accent paint between the spokes, with bright, cup-style metal center caps). These new Turbine Style wheels would be standard on Designer Series models.

Standard tires in all three years were Michelin (225-15) steel-belted radials with a narrow white sidewall design.
First optional in 1975, and remaining so through the end of the 1979 model year, were Goodyear's LR78-15" Custom Polysteel radials, in a Lincoln-exclusive dual band wide whitewall design. 
To increase trunk space, a new-for-1977 inflatable spare tire option (which includes a pressurized canister of propellant) would replace the standard conventional full-size spare. Regardless of any exterior wheel option selected, the standard, conventional spare tire would be of either Michelin or Goodyear brand (matching the vehicle's four exterior tires), but would be mounted on a standard, 15-inch conventional steel wheel.

An optional Illuminated Entry System—a timed (25-second) interior courtesy light illumination system with lighted door lock cylinder rings (activated by lifting either exterior door handle)—also made its debut for 1977. This feature would set the stage for Ford's exclusive and popular Illuminated/Keyless Entry System (with driver's door belt molding mounted keypad), which would first be seen on the then newly downsized Continental Mark VI, Lincoln Continental, Ford Thunderbird and Mercury Cougar XR-7 beginning in the 1980 model year.

1978 
A larger radiator, heater core inlets and hoses were new, for improved coolant flow and heater performance. Door lock cylinders and ignition lock switches were also revised for greater theft protection. The standard 6.6 L (400 cid) V8 engine got a slight detuning for better fuel economy, while the 7.5 L V8 soldiered on for one more year.

A super-luxurious (and expensive) Diamond Jubilee Edition Mark V was introduced to help commemorate Ford Motor Company's 75th anniversary. The Diamond Jubilee Edition was available on both the Thunderbird over at Ford, as well as the Continental Mark V.  Designer Series Editions and the Luxury Group offerings continued with revised color selections and trim.

With the mid-1977 introduction of Versailles, Lincoln was the first American car manufacturer to produce a two-stage base-coat/clear-coat paint process for their mid-sized luxury sedan. For 1978, this new two-stage paint process was expanded to both the Mark V and Continental, (for metallic colors only). This process produced a rich, deep, and especially glossy finish, because the paint pigment was protected beneath a layer of high-gloss clear acrylic enamel. Non-metallic, solid paint colors still continued to use the traditional, single-stage paint process (no clearcoat).

Joining the optional Full Vinyl and Rear Landau Vinyl roof options for 1978, was a new, full-length, simulated convertible "Carriage Roof" option (available only in white canvas-embossed vinyl - with interior rear seat side-quarter trim panel vanity mirrors - in place of the normally standard opera windows, which were deleted with this option). The Power Glass Moonroof option was not available on Mark V when equipped with the Carriage Roof.

Also new options for 1978: a digital (L.E.D. display) "Miles-to-Empty" fuel indicator (which replaced the standard "Low Fuel" warning light unit in its location within the instrument panel below the fuel gauge), new Wire Wheel Covers (non-locking), a fully integrated Garage Door Opener control (built into the lower edge of the driver's side illuminated visor-vanity mirror), a new driver's side outside mirror-mounted Illuminated Thermometer, as well as Ford's new 40-channel CB radio with fully integrated hand-held microphone and controls, which also included a new, integrated tri-band (AM/FM/CB) power antenna - in place of the standard issue (AM/FM) power antenna.

Also new, (for 1978 only), were slightly revised standard Luxury wheel covers, with fewer ribs along the outside diameter of a slightly more-convex/bulging brushed center portion of the wheel cover. This wheel cover style would then only appear one more time, on the downsized 1980 Lincoln Continental and Town Car and Town Coupé models.

1978 also marked Ford's first usage of (the short-lived; 1978–79) electro-mechanical seat belt warning chimes, available, and standard only on Diamond Jubilee Edition. Lesser Mark Vs (in all years) were equipped with a traditional basic seatbelt warning buzzer, and for those whoever owned or own one ever started the car with the driver's door open, and not buckled in, the separately wired "key in ignition" warning buzzer unit would also start to buzz, triggering both units at the same time, each at a slightly different sound frequency.

1979 
In the engine compartment, the now-seemingly gigantic 7.5 L (460 cid) V8 and dual-exhaust 400 V8 are discontinued, all in the name of helping Ford Motor Company meet the US government-mandated Corporate Average Fuel Economy (CAFE) standards which were enforced beginning in 1978.

A new AM/FM stereo radio with cassette tape player, as well as Ford's new top-of-the-line Electronic AM/FM Stereo Search Radio with Quadrasonic 8-track tape player, were added as new radio options. The latter received a floor-mounted foot-switch (inboard of the physically identical floor-mounted headlamp dimmer switch), which would allow the driver to left-foot-tap the switch to scan radio stations or advance tracks on the 8-track player, without having to take their hands off the steering wheel.

As Mark V and Continental were in their final year of being the largest, and the last "traditional-sized luxury" production cars in America (and the world, for that matter), a commemorative "Collector's Series" package (a few months later, an actual stand-alone listed model) was introduced. The ever-popular Designer Series and optional Luxury Group offerings continued - yet again in newly revised color and trim selections.

The 1972-style Luxury Wheel Covers returned for Mark V's final year as standard issue (on all but Collector's Series and Designer Series models) - as would the optional Wire Wheel Covers (now standard on Emilio Pucci Designer Series) and Forged Aluminum Wheels. The also-optional very popular Turbine Style Aluminum Wheels continued with argent accent paint between the spokes, except on Collector's Series, and the Cartier, Bill Blass and Givenchy Designer Series - where these models would be treated to color-keyed paint between the spokes, for unique added flair.

The Carriage Roof option (still only available in white canvas-embossed vinyl; but now standard on Bill Blass Designer Series) received new interior rear quarter trim panel inserts (a blanked off, color-keyed padded vinyl insert filler panel covering the area where the deleted opera windows were - with round (non-switch-operated) reading/courtesy lights in the center of these panels on each side; thus effectively replacing 1978's rear quarter panel vanity mirrors). These new interior quarter trim panel inserts would also appear on the Collector's Series, (in color-keyed vinyl, or cloth – depending on the seat trim color) as the exterior landau roof design also eliminated the opera windows on this model. Here, though, the reading/courtesy lights in these quarter panel inserts had control switches above the rear seat quarter armrests, to allow them to operate as customary door-jamb activated interior courtesy lights, as well as rear seat passengers being able to switch them on and off independently as true reading lamps.

1978's electro-mechanical seat belt warning chimes carried over into 1979...and were now not only standard on Collector's Series, but were also standard on the Designer Series models as well.  From 1980-on, selected (higher-end) trim levels of Ford-Lincoln-Mercury models would adopt the use of a solid state, all-electronic combination (seat belt, 'key in ignition' and optional 'headlamps-on') warning chime module, with no moving parts, and no more buzzers.

Full and Rear Landau vinyl roof options continued for 1979. The all-metal, body-color painted roof also continued as standard equipment - though would rarely be seen. This all-metal roof style would not appear on a Mark again until the introduction of the all-new, Fox-based aerodynamic Mark VII for 1984.

Features 

Standard on all Mark Vs are four-wheel disc brakes (continuing is the "Sure-Track" anti-skid brake system from the Mark IV, as an option), a "Cartier" embossed logoed sweep-hand clock with day/date feature, and full power accessories including Automatic Temperature Control air conditioning, power windows, six-way power driver's seat, power radio antenna, etc.

A new optional feature for the 1978 Mark V was the "Miles-To-Empty" indicator. This was a small rectangular display, located to the right of the steering wheel, which sat in place of the standard equipment "low fuel" warning lamp. The amber LED readout would indicate the estimated distance (in miles) available before reaching empty based on remaining fuel, fuel consumption, and driving habits. This system was a precursor to the electronic digital full-instrumentation which would be available on the 1980 Continental Mark VI. The system represents a first for an American automobile manufacturer, as it is the first dashboard LED display of an automobile's mechanical function.

Editions
Through its production, the Continental Mark V was produced in several different editions to highlight the Mark V.  While not a specific edition, the Luxury Group option package allowed buyers near-complete control over selecting exterior and interior trim options.  Carrying on a tradition from the Mark IV, the Designer Series editions were Mark Vs with specially-selected exterior and interior trim.    

Two commemorative editions of the Mark V were produced: the 1978 Diamond Jubilee Edition (marking the 75th anniversary of Ford Motor Company) and 1979 Collector's Series (marking the end of Mark V production).  In addition to edition-specific exterior and interior trim, both editions included virtually every available feature for the Mark V.

Luxury Group (1977–1979)
From 1973 to 1981, Lincoln offered the Luxury Group option for Mark-series buyers, effectively allowing a customer to custom-design their vehicle from the dealer.  In the example of the 1977–1979 Mark V, the Luxury Group was derived from an interior color name (see below), selected below.  Following the color selection, the customer selected cloth or leather/vinyl interior trim.  On the exterior, the customer chose the paint color(s); depending on preferences, one color could be chosen or as many as four.  The roof style was chosen (landau or full-length; theoretically, a painted metal roof was available) along with its color.  In addition to the roof choice, the customer chose the color of the bodyside molding (otherwise black) and the decklid paint stripe; the customer would also choose over several combinations of wheels or wheel covers and whitewall tires.  

Along with various combinations of exterior and interior trim, customers ordering the Luxury Group ordered any options from the Mark V option list.  With a nearly endless number of potential combinations, the Luxury Group allowed a potential Mark V customer to build a vehicle ranging from understated and elegant to dramatically flashy, or anywhere in between.       

Below are some examples of the Luxury Group Mark Vs available throughout its three-year production run:
Gold-Cream  (1977–1979)
Cordovan (1977–1979)
Light Jade/Dark Jade (1977–1978)
Turquoise (1979)
Midnight Blue-Cream (1977)
Red-Rosé (1977–1979)
Wedgewood Blue (1978–1979)
Champagne (1979)
White (1979)
Majestic Velour (1977)

Designer Series (1977–1979)
Continuing the Designer Series special edition option packages introduced by the Mark IV, the Continental Mark V returned the Bill Blass, Cartier, Givenchy, and Emilio Pucci Designer Series.  A "designer label" cosmetic upgrade, the four option packages each consisted of designer-coordinated exterior paint colors, interior upholstery and trim, vinyl roof and body-side moldings.   Each Designer Series was distinguished by a corresponding designer's logo decal on the decklid, the designer's signature embedded in the opera window glass, along with a 22-karat gold-plated nameplate plaque to be mounted on the instrument panel (customers would receive this shortly after taking delivery of their new Mark V Designer Series).

Along with each Designer Series differing from each other, all four Designer Series were changed in colors and trim each year.  In 1979, the Bill Blass, Cartier, and Givenchy Designer Series adopted color-keyed alloy wheels alongside the Collector's Series (a feature introduced on the Diamond Jubilee Edition).

Diamond Jubilee Edition (1978)

To commemorate the 75th anniversary of Ford Motor Company in 1978; Ford released Diamond Jubilee Editions of the 1978 Ford Thunderbird and Continental Mark V.  Adding $8,000 to the price of a Mark V, the Continental Mark V Diamond Jubilee was the most expensive vehicle ever sold by Ford Motor Company at the time, raising the price of the Mark V to over $21,000 ($ in  dollars ). Only four options were available: the 460 V8 (with or without dual exhaust), a power moonroof, and a 40-channel CB radio.

In a style similar to the Designer Series, the Diamond Jubilee Edition was given its own design.  The exterior was given a nearly monochromatic exterior, with color-keyed body moldings, vinyl top, wheels, grille, hood ornament, and trunklid; two colors were available and exclusive to the edition (Diamond Blue and Jubilee Gold).  Chrome trim was largely limited to the window and grille surrounds, bumpers, and trim of the fender vents (exclusive to the edition).  Alongside the Lincoln Versailles, the Diamond Jubilee Edition was one of the first Ford Motor Company vehicles to utilize clearcoat paint.

The interior was given its own model-specific trim. The split front bench seat was replaced by cloth bucket seats with a center console with a padded armrest; the rest of the interior included padded leather on high-wear areas.  Designed to provide extra storage, the console stored an umbrella on the underside of the armrest.  Matching its name, the opera windows featured simulated diamond chips inside the glass, with a Diamond Jubilee script on the window the hood ornament featured crystal-style inserts.  All Diamond Jubilee Marks were supplied with a leather bound owner's manual and tool kit.  Every new owner was given car keys matching the interior trim and could request a Ford-created cookbook entitled "Ford Diamond Jubilee Recipe Collection".

In total, 5,159 Diamond Jubilee Edition Continental Mark Vs were produced.  For 1979, the edition was repackaged as the Collector's Series.

Collector's Series (1979)

To commemorate the end of Continental Mark V production, the 1978 Diamond Jubilee Edition was repackaged for 1979 as the Collector's Series.  An $8,000 option for the Mark V ($ in  dollars ), the Collector's Series Edition had a base price of nearly $22,000 ($ in  dollars ).  Alongside the Mark V, Lincoln marketed a similar edition of the Lincoln Continental sedan.

Distinguished from all other examples of the Mark V by its lack of opera windows, the Collector's Series was produced in four colors Midnight Blue Moondust Metallic, White, Diamond Blue Moondust Metallic (shared with the Diamond Jubilee Edition), and Light Silver Moondust Metallic.  In a slightly monochromatic appearance, midnight blue and white cars have matching vinyl tops while silver and diamond-blue cars have midnight blue vinyl tops; all examples were given a gold-colored grille with a gold-trimmed hood ornament.  Inside the trunk, both the trunk floor and the underside of the decklid were lined with color-keyed midnight-blue 18-ounce carpeting.

As with the Diamond Jubilee Edition, the Collector's Series included virtually every available feature as standard equipment on the Mark V.  A cloth interior with a center console, rear-seat armrest, and bucket seats was standard; as a delete option, the Collector's Series could be ordered with a standard Mark V leather interior.  Another delete option replaced the 8-track tape player with a cassette player.

In total, 6,262 Collector's Series editions were produced.  3,900 Midnight Blue examples were built, with 2,040 White (an unknown number without any vinyl top), 197 Diamond Blue, and 125 Silver.

Sales 
Although only on sale for three model years, with a total of 228,262 examples sold, the Continental Mark V is the best-selling version of the Continental Mark Series.

Reception 
Excerpts from Motor Trend, April 1980, which compared the then-new Mark VI (a Cartier 351-2 model with a 2.73:1 diff) against the Mark V (a Bill Blass model with a 3.08:1 diff):

"....another automotive era ended in 1979.  The press releases summed it up by calling the '79 Continental "the last traditionally full-sized American car."  The hardware of the matter is that the car is one of the largest mass-produced passenger cars ever to roll off an assembly line.  With an overall length of 230.3 inches, a wheelbase of 120.3 inches, and a curb weight of 4,763 pounds, it is a dinosaur, and the changing nature of the times will no longer tolerate such blatantly consumptive machines for personal transportation....

....The 1979 Mark V was the essence of unconstrained American automotive opulence, conceived in a time when fuel economy and space efficiency were the concerns of lesser cars.

....Though the styling of the Mark V was unchanged from '78 to '79, there were some mechanical and engineering refinements......Weight reduction techniques that included use of plastics, high-strength lightweight steel, thinner glass, and aluminum for such engine parts as the intake manifold and water pump produced a 400-pound weight reduction [from 1978], as compared to the 930 pounds surrendered by the Mark VI models.

....Even with the weight loss, the Mark V is a huge piece of machinery, albeit a desirable one in terms of potential value.  It is the last of a breed and has sufficient quality and style to assure eventual classic status It is entirely likely that, in 10 years, the owners of such cars will discover that they have a piece of collectible automotive machinery.

....To drive the Mark V is to be the captain of your own huge, luxurious ship.  In an operational sense, the Mark V is massive, smooth and competent only in boulevard or highway applications.....What it was designed to do, it does very well.  It isolates the driver and passengers from the outside world, and when you're driving, it makes you feel - and makes other people think you are - rich.  Even with its rather straight-lined, sharp-edged styling, the car has a certain rakishness and projects the image of the driver as an elegant rogue.

....This intangible quality is exactly what we found lacking in the Mark VI.  It has a more formal look - the result of a more squared-off roof and trunk line - that would tend to make you think of the driver as a successful accountant....The interior produces none of that feeling of decadence.  It is light and airy, as opposed to the cocoon feeling of the Mark V, and has a little too much space-age gadgetry and undisguised plastic to fit the traditional definitions of luxury.

....The Mark V is the pinnacle of 60 years of automotive definitions...."

References

External links
 Mark V Resource Site

Mark 5
Coupés
Rear-wheel-drive vehicles
1970s cars
Personal luxury cars